Maisonnais-sur-Tardoire (literally Maisonnais on Tardoire) is a commune in the Haute-Vienne department in the Nouvelle-Aquitaine region in west-central France.

Tourism
It is a pretty little village with a sixteenth-century church that has a square steeple.  It also has a village shop, a school, a town hall, a small post office and a cemetery. 

It is 6 kilometres from the nearest small town, Saint-Mathieu which has a variety of shops and bars and a tennis court, as well as a swimming lake.

It is central to three capital cities, Angoulème the capital of the Charente, with its famous cartoon museum; Limoges the capital of the Limousin, famous for its history of porcelain manufacture and Périgueux the capital of the Périgord.

See also
Communes of the Haute-Vienne department

References

Communes of Haute-Vienne